Trine Fissum (born  in Trondheim) is a Norwegian wheelchair curler.

She participated at the 2006 Winter Paralympics where Norwegian team finished on fourth place.

She is a  curler.

Wheelchair curling teams and events

References

External links 

Living people
1970 births
Sportspeople from Trondheim
Norwegian female curlers
Norwegian wheelchair curlers
Paralympic wheelchair curlers of Norway
Wheelchair curlers at the 2006 Winter Paralympics
World wheelchair curling champions